The 2014–15 season was Dumbarton's third consecutive season in the second tier of Scottish football - the Scottish Championship, having been promoted from the Scottish Second Division at the end of the 2011–12 season. The season marked Ian Murray's second full season as manager.

Dumbarton finished seventh in the Scottish Championship. They continued their poor form in the Challenge Cup by losing in the first round to Stranraer, reached the second round of the League Cup and the third round of the Scottish Cup.

Results & fixtures

Pre season

SPFL Championship

Scottish Challenge Cup

Scottish League Cup

Scottish Cup

Stirlingshire Cup

League table

Player statistics

|}

Transfers

Players in

Players out

See also
List of Dumbarton F.C. seasons

References 

Dumbarton F.C. seasons
Scottish football clubs 2014–15 season